Interpieces Organization is a collaborative album by Haruomi Hosono and Bill Laswell. It was released on February 21, 1996 by Baidis.

Track listing

Personnel 
Adapted from the Interpieces Organization liner notes.

Musicians
Haruomi Hosono – effects, producer (1-3, 7)
Tetsu Inoue – electronics (1, 3, 4, 6)
Miharu Koshi – voice (1, 4)
Bill Laswell – effects, producer (1-3)
Terre Thaemlitz – Remix (5)

Technical
Bobby Hata – mastering
Akira Kitajima – cover art
Robert Musso – engineering (1-3)

Release history

References

External links 
 
 Interpieces Organization at Bandcamp

1996 albums
Collaborative albums
Haruomi Hosono albums
Bill Laswell albums
Albums produced by Haruomi Hosono
Albums produced by Bill Laswell